The Pittsburgh Cable News Channel (PCNC) is a cable news channel and digital subchannel of WPXI serving the Western Pennsylvania area. It is owned by Cox Media Group. PCNC simulcasts or replays much of WPXI's programming. It continues to produce two original talk shows, "Pittsburgh Now" and "Night Talk", along with local news and regional business news.

History
PCNC first started broadcasting on January 1, 1994, created in a partnership between WPXI (Channel 11) and the region's largest cable TV company at the time, TCI. Comcast (Xfinity) stopped carrying PCNC on January 1, 2020, greatly reducing the viewing audience. WPXI added PCNC to its digital subchannel lineup in early March 2023.

Since 1996, PCNC has produced the local prime time talk show "Night Talk", featuring one-on-one interviews of local newsmakers. It is currently hosted by Beaver County sports hall-of-fame broadcaster Ellis Cannon. Other shows aired on the channel include "Pittsburgh Now"; "Our Region's Business", hosted by Bill Flanagan (not to be confused with radio and TV host Bill Flanagan) of the Allegheny Conference; and local newscasts multiple times per day with reporting from WPXI.

References

Cox Media Group
24-hour television news channels in the United States
Television channels and stations established in 1994
Cable television in the United States
Television stations in Pittsburgh
1994 establishments in Pennsylvania